Cupey is one of the 18 barrios of the municipality of San Juan, Puerto Rico located in the mountainous area of the municipality. It is the largest barrio or district in the San Juan and the third most populous with 36,058 inhabitants according to the 2010 US Census. The territorial land area of Cupey is 7.49 square miles (19.40 km2). It is bound by the municipality of Caguas to the South, by the municipality of Trujillo Alto to the East, by the barrios of Caimito and Monacillo to the West, and by the barrios of El Cinco and Sabana Llana Sur to the North. Between 1990 and 2000 Cupey had a 17.98% increase in population, more than any other barrio in San Juan.

History
Established in 1878, this barrio was a former ward of the now defunct town of Río Piedras. It was divided into the subbarrios of Cupey Alto and Cupey Bajo. It is named for the Cupey tree, sometimes spelled copey (Clusia rosea), which is indigenous to the Caribbean. It belongs to the family Clusiaceae. Linguistically, cupey or copey most likely come from the Taino language (cubey) and might or might not share a lexical relation to the name Cuba.

Puerto Rico was ceded by Spain in the aftermath of the Spanish–American War under the terms of the Treaty of Paris of 1898 and became an unincorporated territory of the United States. In 1899, the United States Department of War conducted a census of Puerto Rico finding that the population of Cupey barrio was 1,834.

In 1956, the Puerto Rico Legislature integrated the town of Río Piedras and the town of San Juan. Today, Cupey is the largest barrio in San Juan in area.

Features
Two of Puerto Rico's largest universities, Interamerican University of Puerto Rico's Metropolitan Campus, and Metropolitan University, a unit of the Ana G. Méndez University System, are located in Cupey.

Renowned TV personality and astrologer, Walter Mercado, is buried at Señorial Memorial Park in Cupey.

Geography
Cupey barrio is 7.49 square miles (19.40 km2). It is bound to the north by the San Juan barrios of El Cinco along State Road PR-176, and by Sabana Llana Sur in the Venus Gardens neighborhood. From the south it is bound by the municipality of Caguas, starting at the intersection of state roads PR-176 and PR-175. From the east it is bound by the town of Trujillo Alto along state road PR-199. From the west it is bordered by the San Juan wards of Caimito, starting at the intersection of state road PR-199 and state highway PR-52, and by Monacillo.

San Juan's only lake, Las Curias Reservoir, is located in Cupey. It was originally dammed in 1946 by the Municipal Government of San Juan to provide potable water to the cities of Río Piedras and San Juan and was later transferred to the Puerto Rico Electric Power Authority (PREPA). it is currently owned by the Puerto Rico Aqueducts and Sewer Authority (PRASA). The earthen dam is approximately 75 feet high and 800 feet long and its design capacity is 1,120 acres-feet.

Notable residents
 Cheo Feliciano, salsa legend
 Raul Julia, actor
 Rafael Hernández, composer and musician
 Lolita Lebrón, Puerto Rico Nationalist leader
 Kenneth McClintock, Secretary of State and Senate President
 Thomas Rivera Schatz, Senate President
 Jorge Santini, Mayor of San Juan
 Félix Trinidad, world champion boxer, member of the International Boxing Hall of Fame
 Felix Trinidad Sr., Puerto Rico national Featherweight boxing champion
 Walter Mercado, Astrologer, actor, dancer, and writer, best known as a television personality for his shows as an astrologer.

See also
 List of communities in Puerto Rico

References

Río Piedras, Puerto Rico
Barrios of San Juan, Puerto Rico